Vivekananda Mukhopadhya was an Indian writer of Bengali literature. He was the author of Dwitiya Mahajuddher Itihas, a three volume book on World War II. The Government of India awarded him Padma Bhushan, the third highest Indian civilian award, in 1970.

References

External links
 
 

Recipients of the Padma Bhushan in literature & education
Writers from West Bengal
20th-century Indian essayists
Bengali writers
1904 births
1993 deaths

 Journalists from West Bengal